The Uniform Child Abduction Prevention Act ("UCAPA") is a Uniform Act drafted by the National Conference of Commissioners on Uniform State Laws (NCCUSL) and submitted for enactment by jurisdictions within the United States in 2006. This uniform law originated by the parents of internationally abducted children, and parents fearing their children would be abducted.

The act provides States with a valuable tool for deterring both domestic and international child abductions by parents and any persons acting on behalf of the parents. Recognizing that most States have already developed substantial bodies of law regarding child custody determinations and enforcement, including specifically the Uniform Child Custody Jurisdiction and Enforcement Act (UCCJEA), the NCCUSL drafted UCAPA to be compatible with and to augment existing state law.

Under UCAPA, an action for abduction prevention measures may be brought either by a court on its own motion, by a party to a child-custody determination or an individual with a right to seek such a determination, or by a prosecutor or public attorney. The party seeking the abduction prevention measures must file a petition with the court specifying the risk factors for abduction as well as other biographical information including the name, age and gender of the child, the current address of the child and the person against whom the measures are sought, a statement regarding any prior actions related to abduction or domestic violence, a statement addressing any prior arrests for domestic violence or child abuse by either party, and finally any additional information required by existing State child custody law including the UCCJEA.

UCAPA sets out a variety of factors in determining whether there is a credible risk a child will be abducted. If a court determines that a credible risk exists that the child will be abducted, it may then enter an order containing provisions and measures meant to prevent abduction. The act lists a number of specific measures that a court may order. These include imposing travel restrictions, prohibiting the individual from removing the child from the State or other set geographic area, placing the child's name in the United States Department of State's Child Passport Issuance Alert Program, or requiring the individual to obtain an order from a foreign country containing identical terms to the child-custody determination. An abduction prevention order is effective until the earliest of the order's expiration, the child's emancipation, the child's 18th birthday, or until the order is modified, revoked, or vacated.

If abduction appears imminent, a court may issue a warrant to take physical custody of the child, direct law enforcement officers to take steps to locate and return the child, or exercise other appropriate powers under existing state laws. A warrant to take physical custody is enforceable in the enacting state even if issued by different state. The court may authorize law enforcement officers to enter private property, or even to make a forcible entry at any hour, if the circumstances so warrant. Nevertheless, the person on whom the warrant is being executed must be served with the warrant when or immediately after the child is taken into custody and the person must be afforded a hearing no later than the next judicial day or the next possible judicial day if the next day is impossible.

Up to date legislative activity  on UCAPA can be found here.

Risk factors 
UCAPA sets out a wide variety of factors that should be considered in determining whether there is a credible risk that a child will be abducted. These factors include overt signs such as previous abductions, attempts to abduct the child, or threats of abduction, as well as signs of general abuse including domestic violence, negligence, or refusal to obey a child-custody determination. The act also includes a wide range of activities that may indicate a planned abduction including abandoning employment, liquidating assets, obtaining travel documents or travel tickets, or requesting the child's school or medical records.

The act also addresses the special problems involved with international child abduction by including several risk factors specifically related to international abduction. In particular, the act requires courts to consider whether the party in question is likely to take a child to a country that isn't a party to the Hague Convention on the Civil Aspects of International Child Abduction, or to a country that places the child at risk, has laws that would restrict access to the child, that is on the current list of state sponsors of terrorism, or is engaged in an active military action or war. In addition, a court will consider issues related to citizenship such as a recent change in citizenship status or a denial of United States Citizenship.

States that have adopted UCAPA 
UCAPA has so far been adopted by 14 states and the District of Columbia. The adoptors, in alphabetical order, are Alabama, Colorado, The District of Columbia, Florida, Kansas, Louisiana, Michigan, Mississippi, Nebraska, Nevada, New Mexico, Pennsylvania, South Dakota, Tennessee and Utah.  
The first seven states to hear the UCAPA legislation passed the law with unanimous votes.

Pre-Louisiana Review 
Nebraska (2/07), Utah (3/07), Kansas (4/07), South Dakota (07), Nevada (5/07), Colorado (5/07)

Post-Louisiana Review 
District of Columbia, Mississippi (09), Alabama (10), Florida, (10), Tennessee (10)

States that adopted UCAPA with significant modifications

Louisiana

Louisiana Modifications  
Louisiana inserted the word "INTERNATIONAL" into the state's version of the Child Abduction Prevention Act.

Louisiana modified the bill to delete application of the Act between states, with an intent to limit application to non-Hague Convention countries.

Louisiana modified the application of the risk factors from being considered singly to requiring that a judge to consider all statutory factors.

Selected Comments from the Louisiana Committee hearings 

Excerpt from comments by Representative Bowler 

Rep. Bowler

Excerpt from Harold Murry Family Law Attorney, Alexandria

Murry:

States that declined to adopt UCAPA 
The UCAPA legislation has failed in most states since the Louisiana review in 2007.
Since Louisiana, the UCAPA law has only passed in states that were not informed of the Louisiana and New Jersey reports.

New Jersey (2008) 
The New Jersey law commission considered the UCAPA, and issued its final report on this bill in December 2008 but did not recommend its adoption. The New Jersey law commission report has been used in defeating this legislation in other states that are considering the UCAPA legislation.

The most significant declination was in New Jersey because they wrote a report detailing why the legislation was unconstitutional.   Their New Jersey Law Commission was recommending that the law be presented to their legislature for passage and had placed their recommendation on the internet for public comment.  LaDads saw this request and provided them the concerns that they had raised in Louisiana.  The New Jersey law commission then issued a report (2008, see link below) highlighting the issues that were raised that they were most concerned with.  After a full review, they then issued a final report summarizing the serious issues with this legislation. They declined to recommend this legislation to their legislature.

Pennsylvania
The Act has been raised several times in Pennsylvania:

 HB 1546 was introduced on 6/18/07 and nothing further is reported.
 In 2009, HB 90 was passed by the House 193 to 0. It is pending in the Senate. HB90 in 2009 by Conklin, Belfanti, O'Brien, Cohen, Kortz, Vulakovich, Youngblood, Donatucci, Brennan, True, Readshaw, Sipthroth, Longietti, Mahoney, Murt, Mann, Melio, Kirkland, Gibbons, freeman, Moul, Fabrizio, Sonney, Solobay, and K Smith. The bill was passed by the House Judiciary and Appropriations committees and voted for by the full house by a 193–0 vote.  The legislation was tabled in the Senate Judiciary committee.
 HB90 by CONKLIN, BELFANTI, M. O'BRIEN, COHEN, KORTZ, VULAKOVICH, YOUNGBLOOD, DONATUCCI, BRENNAN, TRUE, READSHAW, SIPTROTH, LONGIETTI, MAHONEY, MURT, MANN, MELIO, KIRKLAND, GIBBONS, FREEMAN, MOUL, FABRIZIO, SONNEY, SOLOBAY, K. SMITH, THOMAS, PETRARCA and CALTAGIRONE.  The bill was referred to the Judiciary committee and tabled on May 26, 2010.
 HB762 in 2011 by Conklin.

New Hampshire

HB1383 in 2008 by Rep Merr Foose. The legislation passed through the house by unanimous vote.  
It was tabled by the Senate committee after receipt of the New Jersey report and the Louisiana concerns of Rep Bowler and Atty Harold Murry. HB694 was tabled in the Senate Committee on June 3, 2009.

South Carolina
S 486 was referred to the Senate Judiciary Subcommittee on 3/1/07. It never progressed beyond the committee. 2009 S 383 was reported favorably by the Judiciary on 3/11/2009, passed by the Senate on 3/24/2009, and referred to the House committee on judiciary 3/25/2009. It did not pass the House committee.

SB383 in 2010 by Hayes.

Texas
The UCAPA law had passed through the House and Senate committee in 2007 by unanimous votes.  The law was on the Senate calendar for noncontroversial passage.  The law never came up for a vote.  However, despite it not being law in Texas, the Texas appeals court used the unapproved version of the law in its decision in the Sigmar case.

HB1207 by was filed on February 9, 2011 and referred to the Judiciary and Civil Jurisprudence committee.  The bill was left pending in committee.  However, the law on which UCAPA is based—Texas's Prevent International Parental Child Abduction Act—had already been enacted in 2003 as Texas Family Code 153.501-503. The parents who drafted this code were against expanding the same language to domestic abduction.

Iowa
2009 HF713 was passed by the House 95 to 1 with 3 not voting on March 18, 2009. Referred to Judiciary. Subcommittee recommended passage March 19. Referred to full Judiciary committee. No further action.

HF 713 Senate Judiciary.  The legislation passed the full House on March 18, 2009 by a 95 to 0 vote.  It was recommended for passage by the Senate committee on March 25, 2009.  It was then referred back to committee on April 26, 2009.  No further action was taken.   In 2010, the committee report on March 4, 2010 without recommendation.  On March 11, 2010 it was placed on the calendar for unfinished business.

Washington
HB1182, by Goodman, Rodne, Miloscia, Williams, Ormsby. The bill was introduced, but failed to move out of the House committee both in 2009 and 2010.

Connecticut 
2007 SB 00595 was referred to the Joint Committee on Judiciary in 2007. No further action was taken after the public hearing before the Joint Committee on Judiciary on 3/1/07.

Michigan 
2007 HB 4925 by Jones, Hansen, Green, LaJoy was introduced on 6/19/2007 and referred to the House Committee on Judiciary. It did not pass out of committee.

Idaho 
2008 SB 1263 was passed by the Senate on 1/31/08 34-0-1. It did not get out of the House Committee.

Hawaii 
SB2192/HB2250 by Tanaguchi/Karamatsu was introduced on January 20, 2010.  It was referred to the HUS, JUD and FIN committees.  On 2/1 the HUS committee recommended that it be passed with amendments.  The votes were 7 to 0 with 2 excused.  The JUD committee recommended it be passed on 2/9/2010 by a 12-0 vote.  The FIN committee recommended that it be passed by 14 to 2 vote.  The full house passed the legislation with Berg, Ching, Marumoto, McKelvey, Pine, Thielen and Ward voting no.  The legislation was referred to the Senate JGO committee on 3/3/2010 where no further action was taken on the legislation.

Minnesota 
SF410/HF1133 bill by Champion and Hayden in 2010 was referred to the Public Safety Policy and Oversight committee.  No further action was taken on this legislation.

Rhode Island 
HB5640 by O'Grady, Tanzi, Blazejewski, Guthrie, Carnevale on March 11, 2011

Virginia 
HB1641 by Virginia in 2011.

New Mexico 
HB56 by Stewart in 2011.

See also
 International Parental Kidnapping Crime Act
 International child abduction

References

External links 
 Full Text of Act with Commentary
  NCCUSL Update on UCAPA
 Agenda for the Louisiana hearing
  First house committee hearing on the bill.  Testimony starts at 2:24 to 3:04
  UCAPA staff letter to the New Jersey Law Commission on 5/8/2008
 New Jersey Law Commission Final Report on Dec 2008
  Chapter 532 Oregon Laws 2003

2006 in American law
Child Abduction Prevention Act